Too Much Business is a 1922 American silent comedy film directed by Jess Robbins and starring Edward Everett Horton, Ethel Grey Terry and Tully Marshall.

Cast
 Edward Everett Horton as 	John Henry Jackson 
 Ethel Grey Terry as 	Myra Dalton
 Tully Marshall as 	Amos Comby
 John Steppling as Simon Stecker
 Carl Gerard as 	Ray Gorham
 Elsa Lorimer as 	Mrs. Comby
 Helen Gilmore as The Head Nurse
 Mark Fenton as Robert Gray
 Tom Murray as 	Officer 16

References

Bibliography
 Connelly, Robert B. The Silents: Silent Feature Films, 1910-36, Volume 40, Issue 2. December Press, 1998.
 Munden, Kenneth White. The American Film Institute Catalog of Motion Pictures Produced in the United States, Part 1. University of California Press, 1997.

External links
 

1922 films
1922 comedy films
1920s English-language films
American silent feature films
Silent American comedy films
American black-and-white films
Films directed by Jess Robbins
Vitagraph Studios films
1920s American films